Hot Moves is an American 1984 comedy film by director Jim Sotos starring Michael Zorek and Jill Schoelen.

Synopsis
Four friends, annoyed at how almost everyone else they know is having sex but them, agree to do what they can to help each other lose their virginity before the end of the summer. Most of their opportunities are foiled by their inexperience and bad planning. Michael, the most sensible boy of the foursome, really just wants to stay with his long-time girlfriend and take their relationship to an intimate level, but after putting him off for six months he grows impatient and splits up with her to seek his fortune elsewhere.

Cast

Reception
Peter Stack of the San Francisco Chronicle gave it a rating of "Snoozing Viewer" saying "Dirty old men may like this movie." The Sacramento Bee's reviewer George Williams finished his negative review "But there isn't one original idea. There are no clean jokes, and no dirty ones you haven't heard too many times already. The photography looks like five o'clock news outtakes. The acting is zero. The music is what you might hear anytime, live, from a neighbor's garage. Enough."

References

External links

American teen comedy films
American sex comedy films
Films about virginity
1980s sex comedy films
1984 films
Teen sex comedy films
1984 comedy films
1980s English-language films
Films directed by Jim Sotos
1980s American films